Bulandshahr, formerly Baran, is a city and a municipal board in Bulandshahr district in the state of Uttar Pradesh, India. 

It is the administrative headquarters of Bulandshahr district and part of Delhi NCR region. According to the Government of India, the district Bulandshahr is one of the Minority Concentrated Districts of India on the basis of the 2011 census data on population, socio-economic indicators and basic amenities indicators. The distance between Bulandshahr and New Delhi is 88.1 km.

Etymology
An early history of Bulandshahr and its origin of name is given by British District magistrate and collector for the Indian Civil Service, Frederic Salmon Growse, in a paper titled "Bulandshahr Antiquities" published in the Journal of the Asiatic Society of Bengal in 1879. Bulandshahr was founded as 'Baran' by the king Ahibaran.

Since it was perched on a highland it came to be known as "high city",, which translates as Bulandshahr in Persian language during the Mughal era.

History

Early history
Growse's discoveries in the 1880s showed that Baran was inhabited by Buddhists between 400 and 600 AD.

The kingdom of Baran came to an end probably during the 12th century. In 1192 CE when Muhammad Ghauri conquered parts of India, his general Qutubuddin Aibak surrounded Fort Baran and conquered it and the Raja Chandrasen Dodiya was killed and Aibak took control of the Baran kingdom.

The ancient ruins found at places in Bhatora Veerpur, Ghalibpur, etc. are indicative of the antiquity of Bulandshahr. There are several other important places in the District from where statues belonging to the medieval age and objects of ancient temples have been found. Even today, several of these historical and ancient objects such as coins, inscriptions etc. are preserved in the State Museum Lucknow.

British rule
Raja Lachhman Singh (1826–1896), who served the government from 1847 and wrote a Statistical Memoir of the Bulandshahr District, moved to Bulandshahr following retirement.

Indian Rebellion of 1857
A large number of Ahir, Gurjar and Rajput rulers, called zamindars, rebelled and attacked Bulandshahr itself on 21 May 1857. The Gurjars and Rajputs plundered multiple towns such as Secunderabad. They burnt down Telegraph lines and Dak Bungalows. The rebelling Nawab, Walidad Khan also belonged from Bulandshahr. The presence of Nawab Walidad Khan in Bulandshahr had completely paralysed the British about this time. The rebels had secured a mud fort under Walidad Khan at Malagarh.

Walidad Khan recruited a large number of Indian Muslims who had been serving in the Irregular Cavalry, such as Skinner's Horse. 

The Indian Rebellion of 1857 is generally associated with the surrounding areas, such as Meerut, Delhi and Aligarh. On 20 May 1857, the 9th regiment of Bulandshahr looted the treasury at Bulandshahr. Sir Alfred Comyn Lyall was subsequently appointed assistant magistrate of Bulandshahr, and Lord Roberts was also present in the district.

Park
Raja Babu Park had been constructed in Bulandshahr in 1837, and a statue of Queen Victoria was placed there in 1901, when the park was renamed ‘Maharani Victoria Park’.

Development under Frederick Growse
Growse, district magistrate and collector of Bulandshahr from 1876 to 1884, resided at Collector's House. In 1884 he published Bulandshahr; or, Sketches of an Indian district; social, historical and architectural.

Post-independence
Following India's independence, ‘Maharani Victoria Park’ was renamed after Shri Rajeshwar Dayal Saxena (Raja Babu), president of the Civil Bar Association and later president of Municipal Board, Bulandshahar. Later it was renamed again back to 'Raja Babu Park'. In 1969 a bust of Mahatma Gandhi was established in the park.

Geography
The distance between Bulandshahr and New Delhi is 68 km. It lies in the Bulandshahr District on the Agra to Delhi Road, and is surrounded by Delhi, Meerut, Moradabad, Badaun and Aligarh.

Demographics
As per provisional data of 2011 census, Bulandshahr urban agglomeration had a population of 235,310, out of which males were 125,549 and females were 111,761. Population in the age groups of 0 to 6 years was 30,886. The total number of literates were 160,203, of which 90,761 were males and 69,442 were females. The effective literacy rate of 7+ population was 78.37%.

Administration and politics
Bulandshahr is one of seven administrative sub-divisions of the District of Bulandshahr.

Buildings
Bulandshahr has four gates; Bunford Club Gate, Fatehganj Gate, Growseganj Gate and Moti Bagh Gate.

Events
The town hosts an annual exhibition known as 'numaish'.

Notable people

Capt. Abbas Ali
Ahibaran, legendary founder of the city
Ziauddin Barani, Indian historian
Kay Baxter, dramatist, journalist and teacher
Amit Bhadana, YouTuber and comedian
Ashiq Ilahi Bulandshahri, Indian Islamic scholar
Sonal Chauhan
Banarasi Das
Jaiprakash Gaur
Saloni Gaur
Arif Mohammad Khan
Bhuvneshwar Kumar, fast bowler in the Indian cricket team.
Satish Kumar
Hitesh Kumari, former minister of UP irrigation department, and MLA from Debai assembly constituency.

Gajendra Pal Singh Raghava, scientist expert in bioinformatics, winner of awards including Shanti Swarup Bhatnagar Prize for Science and Technology
Lakhan Rawat, cricketer
Arfa Khanum Sherwani, Indian journalist
Kushal Pal Singh, CEO of DLF Limited, India's largest real estate developer.
Neera Yadav, ex-officer of the Indian Administrative Service.
Yogendra Singh Yadav, youngest ever Param Vir Chakra winner

Gallery

See also
Baranwal

References

External links
Bulandshahr: Or, Sketches of an Indian District: Social, Historical and Architectural. Frederic Salmon Growse, Benares (1884).

 
Cities in Uttar Pradesh